The Fifteen Whispered Prayers (Arabic: مُناجاتُ خَمْسَ عَشَرَةَ), also known as The Fifteen Munajat, is a collection of fifteen prayers attributed to Ali ibn Husayn Zayn al-Abidin (Imam Sajjad), the fourth Imam of Shia Muslims. Imam Sajjad is also the author of Al-Sahifa al-Sajjadiyya, another collection of prayers, and some researchers regard the whispered prayers as a supplementary part of the latter collection.

Contents

Every person experiences different feelings towards God throughout life. The Fifteen Whispered Prayers enable a person to recite the prayer which is in most accordance with his present mood and feeling. The prayers start with 'repentance', as repentance is the first step towards a genuine communion with God.

The Whispered Prayer of the Repenters
The Whispered Prayer of the Complainants
The Whispered Prayer of the Fearful 
The Whispered Prayer of the Hopeful
The Whispered Prayer of the Desirous
The Whispered Prayer of the Grateful
The Whispered Prayer of the Obedient Toward God
The Whispered Prayer of the Devotees
The Whispered Prayer of the Lovers
The Whispered Prayer of the Mediation Seekers
The Whispered Prayer of the Utterly Poor
The Whispered Prayer of the Enlightened
The Whispered Prayer of the Aware
The Whispered Prayer of the Asylum Seekers
The Whispered Prayer of the Ascetic

Background
In the time of Imam Ali ibn Husayn Zayn al-Abidin, Islam was characterized by ignorance and corruption. Yazid and Marwan Ibn Hakam, who proclaimed themselves Amir al-Mu'minin, the leaders of Muslims, were, in fact, twisting the teachings of Islam. Nevertheless, no Muslim dared challenge their reign. The uprising of Imam Husayn ibn Ali against Yazid was mercilessly crushed. In a bloody encounter known as Battle of Karbala, all of Imam Husayn's men were slain except his young son, Ali, who was severely ill during that battle. At such a time when all freedom movements had been crushed and no one felt safe to speak out, prayer was the only vehicle to promote the true essence of Islam without arousing the caliph's ire.

Analysis
Muhammad Jamaluddin al-Makki al-Amili, known as al-Shaheed al-Awwal (the first martyr) is said to have collected and added the fifteen prayers to the Al-Sahifa al-Sajjadiyya in his book Al-Lum'at al-Dimashqiyya (The Damascene Glitter). Afterwards, most scholars who have written about the fifteen whispered prayers, considered them as a complementary section of the Al-Sahifa al-Sajjadiyya, while some others distinguished between the 54 supplications which makes the main body of Sahifa, and the added part which consists of the fifteen whispered prayers. According to Chittick the original fifty-four supplications "show an undeniable freshness and unity of theme and style, while the latter… add a certain orderliness and self-conscious artistry which may suggest the hand of an editor." Nevertheless, these prayers have come to the attention of Shiites by Muhammad Baqir Majlisi who has narrated them in the authority of some companions of Imam Zany al-Abedin from the Imam.

See also

Al-Sahifa al-Sajjadiyya
Supplication of Abu Hamza al-Thumali
Nahj al-Balagha
Al-Risalah al-Dhahabiah
Al-Risalah al-Huquq
Al-Sahifat al-Ridha
List of Shia books

Notes

References

External links
Fifteen Whispered Prayers-Arabic Audios
Fifteen Whispered Prayers-English Audios
Whispered Prayer of the Repenters-English Lectures

Prayer books
Shia Islam
Shia literature
Shia prayers
Salah terminology